= Nawab Wali Muhammad Khan railway station =

Railway station in Pakistan

Coordinates: 26.399331°N 68.040038°E

General information
- Owner: Ministry of Railways

Other information
- Station code: NWMK

History
- Former names: Great Indian Peninsula Railway
Location

Nawab Wali Muhammad Khan railway station (Urdu: نواب والی محمد خان ریلوے اسٹیشن) is located in Pakistan.

== See also ==
- List of railway stations in Pakistan
- Pakistan Railways
